Paskerdūmys (formerly) is a village in Kėdainiai district municipality, in Kaunas County, in central Lithuania. According to the 2011 census, the village had a population of 5 people. There is a farm.

History
At the beginning of the 20th century there were two Paskerdūmys estates. One of them (current Paskerdūmys) was a property of the Jelenskiai, and the other was known as Zacišė (now Paskerdūmiukas).

Demography

References

Villages in Kaunas County
Kėdainiai District Municipality